Visitors to North Macedonia must obtain a visa from one of the North Macedonia diplomatic missions unless they come from one of the visa exempt countries.

Visa policy of North Macedonia is similar to the visa policy of the Schengen Area. It grants 90-day visa-free entry to all Schengen Annex II nationalities except Dominica, Grenada, Kiribati, Marshall Islands, Micronesia, Palau, Samoa, Saint Lucia, Saint Vincent and the Grenadines, Solomon Islands, Timor-Leste, Tonga, Trinidad and Tobago, Tuvalu and Vanuatu. It also grants visa free access to several additional countries – Azerbaijan, Botswana, Cuba, Kazakhstan, Kosovo, and Turkey.

Foreign visitors must hold passports that are valid for at least 90 days from the date of arrival, and show an accommodation booking if they have no residence in the country.

Visa policy map

Visa exemption
Holders of passports of the following 83 jurisdictions are visa exempt for a stay up to the duration listed below:

In addition:
 Holders of a valid Type "C" multiple-entry visa for the Schengen Area or a temporary/permanent residence permit of an EU Member State or a country signatory of the Schengen Agreement may enter North Macedonia for up to 15 days visa free. A temporary residence permit is also acceptable since 27 February 2019.
 Holders of a valid UK, Canada or USA visa may enter North Macedonia for up to 15 days visa free. (This decision is of a temporary character and shall be in force from 1 January 2023 to 31 December 2023.)
 Holders of UN travel documents do not require a visa.

Conditional visa exemption
Nationals of the following two countries who hold ordinary passports are visa exempt only if they are entering North Macedonia as a tourist and hold a "tourist voucher", or are in a travel group organised by travel agencies:

Diplomatic and official passports
Additionally, only holders of diplomatic and official passports of the following countries do not require visas for North Macedonia:

Reciprocity

Citizens of North Macedonia can enter some of the countries whose citizens are granted visa-free access to North Macedonia without a visa but they require a visa for Antigua and Barbuda, Australia, Azerbaijan, Barbados, Brunei, Canada, Ireland, Kazakhstan, Mauritius (grants visa on arrival), Mexico, New Zealand, Paraguay, Saint Kitts and Nevis, South Korea, United Arab Emirates, United Kingdom, United States, Uruguay and Venezuela.

See also

Visa policy of the Schengen Area
Visa requirements for citizens of North Macedonia

Annotations

References

External links
Entry visa for North Macedonia

North Macedonia
Foreign relations of North Macedonia